Dagguirou is a town located in the Dikhil Region of Djibouti. It is situated approximately  western of the nation's capital city of Djibouti, and roughly  northern of Dikhil, the regional capital.

History

Dagguirou was a small village when the French created their French Somaliland.

The Italians complained that the area was part of Italian Eritrea. In 1935 they created a group of small fortifications (Abba, Dagguirou, Gouma, etc.) inside the western border of French Somaliland, claiming at the end of 1937 that the territory was inside their colonial area.
Between 1 and 10 July 1940 several clashes with the Italians took place on the plain of Hanlé, at Ali-Sabieh and along the railroad. The border area of western French Somalia (during the first months of World War II) was occupied by Italian troops, who only withdrew from Hanlé in October 1940 and only in March 1941 from Dagguirou.

Actually Dagguirou has a population of nearly 2,000 inhabitants.

Overview
Nearby towns and villages include Galafi (5 km), Yoboki (36 km), Dikhil (95 km) and Mouloud (113 km).

Climate
Dagguirou is located in the Hanlé plain of Djibouti.

Notes

Bibliography

See also

 French Somaliland in World War II

Populated places in Djibouti